The SSLV-D2 was the second mission of the Small Satellite Launch Vehicle (SSLV). The vehicle carried three payloads: EOS - 07, Antaris US Firm named as Janus-01 and AzaadiSAT-2 by SpaceKidz India.

Details
ISRO launched the Small Satellite Launch Vehicle (SSLV) in Low Earth orbit, on 10th February 2023 from the first launchpad of Satish Dhawan Space Centre in Sriharikota.Which was containing three payloads having total mass of 172.6 kg(approx.).

This was the follow up mission of SSLV-D1 with main objectives to Demonstration of in-flight performance of SSLV vehicle systems and injection of all three satellites into 450km Low Earth orbit.

Mission statistics
 Mass:
 Total liftoff weight: 
 Payload weight: 
 Overall height: 
 Propellant:
 Stage 1: Solid HTPB based
 Stage 2: Solid HTPB based
 Stage 3: Solid HTPB based
 Stage 4 (VTM): Liquid MMH + MON-3
 Altitude: 
 Inclination: 37.2°
 Period: 923.6 seconds
 Launch azimuth: 135°

Launch
The second SSLV development launch was carried out on 10th February, 2023 from the first launchpad of Satish Dhawan Space Centre in Sriharikota.

References

ISRO space launch vehicles
Small Satellite Launch Vehicle